Alpine butterfly may refer to:

Biology
 Erebia, a genus of butterflies common in the Rocky Mountains of North America
 Parnassius, a genus of butterflies in Eurasia

Knots
 Alpine butterfly knot, used to form a fixed loop in the middle of a rope
 Alpine butterfly bend, used to join the ends of two ropes together